Leonard Mashako Mamba (March 15, 1951 – September 25, 2017) was a politician in the Democratic Republic of the Congo.

He was Minister of Health and close to Laurent-Désiré Kabila, at his side during his assassination on 16 January 2001. He left the government when the Transitional Government in 2003 was installed, replaced by Dr. Jean Yagi Sitolo, former Governor of the Province Orientale. He returned as Minister of Higher Education in the first and second Adolphe Muzito cabinets, holding this position as of September 2011.

References

1951 births
2017 deaths
Government ministers of the Democratic Republic of the Congo
21st-century Democratic Republic of the Congo people